Castle is a district and electoral ward of the city of Cambridge, England. It is named after the former Cambridge Castle which once stood on Castle Mound. In the UK Census 2011 the population of Castle was 9,785.

The population of Castle Ward is being increased by the North West Cambridge Development, at its centre, Eddington, which began to be occupied in 2017.

Castle ward borders the following other wards within the city of Cambridge (from North, proceeding clockwise): Arbury,  Market and Newnham.  Castle is represented by three councillors on Cambridge City Council.  Castle Electoral Division, which has different boundaries since 2017, is represented by one councillor on Cambridgeshire County Council.

References

See also 
 Castle Hill, Cambridge

Wards of Cambridge